Peronidella is an extinct genus of Calcareous sponges found in marine sedimentary rocks dated between the Devonian and the Cretaceous periods.

These sponges had cylindrically shaped walls, with a typical diameter of 2 cm, with a small platform at the top, showing the position of the Osculum.
Many species, such as Peronidella furcata, were colonial; however, several solitary species are known.

These sponges are relatively abundant in European chalks

References

Calcarea
Prehistoric sponge genera
Carboniferous animals of Europe
Permian animals of Africa